Selmer may refer to:

 Selmer (surname)
 Selmer (given name)
 Selmer, Tennessee, United States, a town
 Selmer group, a group constructed from an isogeny of abelian varieties

See also
 Conn-Selmer, a manufacturer and distributor of musical instruments
 Henri Selmer Paris, a musical instrument manufacturer, associated with Conn-Selmer
 Semler, a surname